is a former Japanese football player.

Club statistics

References

External links

1978 births
Living people
Kokushikan University alumni
Association football people from Ōita Prefecture
Japanese footballers
J2 League players
Japan Football League players
Kataller Toyama players
Association football defenders